Robert Delaunay (12 April 1885 – 25 October 1941) was a French artist who, with his wife Sonia Delaunay and others, co-founded the Orphism art movement, noted for its use of strong colours and geometric shapes. His later works were more abstract. His key influence related to bold use of colour and a clear  love of experimentation with both depth and tone.

Overview

Delaunay is most closely identified with Orphism.  From 1912 to 1914, he painted nonfigurative paintings based on the optical characteristics of brilliant colors that were so dynamic they would function as the form. His theories are mostly concerned with color and light and influenced many, including Stanton Macdonald-Wright, Morgan Russell, Patrick Henry Bruce, Der Blaue Reiter, August Macke, Franz Marc, Paul Klee, and Lyonel Feininger. Art Critic Guillaume Apollinaire was strongly influenced by Delaunay's theories of color and often quoted from them to explain Orphism, which he had named. Delaunay's fixations with color as the expressive and structural means were sustained by his study of color.

In the prime of his career he painted a number of series that included: the Saint-Sévrin series (1909–10); the City series (1909–1911); the Eiffel Tower series (1909–1912); the City of Paris series (1911–12); the Window series (1912–1914); the Cardiff Team series (1913); the Circular Forms series (1913); and The First Disk (1913).

His writings on color, which were influenced by scientists and theoreticians, are intuitive and can sometimes be random statements based on the belief that color is a thing in itself, with its own powers of expression and form. He believes painting is a purely visual art that depends on intellectual elements, and perception is in the impact of colored light on the eye. The contrasts and harmonies of color produce in the eye simultaneous movements and correspond to movement in nature. Vision becomes the subject of painting.

His early paintings are deeply rooted in Neoimpressionism. Night Scene, for example, has vigorous activity, with the use of lively brushstrokes in bright colors against a dark background, not defining solid objects but the areas that surround them.

The spectral colors of Neoimpressionism were later abandoned. The Eiffel Tower series represented the fragmentation of solid objects and their merging with space. Influences in this series were Cézanne, Analytical Cubism, and Futurism. In the Eiffel Tower the interpenetration of tangible objects and surrounding space is accompanied by the intense movement of geometric planes that are more dynamic than the static equilibrium of Cubist forms.

Biography

Early life
Robert Delaunay was born in Paris, the son of George Delaunay and Countess Berthe Félicie de Rose. While he was a child, Delaunay's parents divorced, and he was raised by his mother's sister Marie and her husband Charles Damour, in La Ronchère near Bourges. When he failed his final exam and said he wanted to become a painter, his uncle in 1902 sent him to Ronsin's atelier to study Decorative Arts in the Belleville district of Paris.

Career beginnings
At age 19, Delaunay left Ronsin to focus entirely on painting and contributed six works to the Salon des Indépendants in 1904. He traveled to Brittany, where he was influenced by the group of Pont-Aven; and, in 1906, he contributed works he painted in Brittany to the 22nd Salon des Indépendants, where he met Henri Rousseau.

Delaunay formed a close friendship at this time with Jean Metzinger, with whom he shared an exhibition at a gallery run by Berthe Weill early in 1907. The two of them were singled out by the art critic Louis Vauxcelles in 1907 as Divisionists who used large, mosaic-like 'cubes' to construct small but highly symbolic compositions.

Robert Herbert writes: "Metzinger's Neo-Impressionist period was somewhat longer than that of his close friend Delaunay... The height of his Neo-Impressionist work was in 1906 and 1907, when he and Delaunay did portraits of each other (Art market, London, and Museum of Fine Arts, Houston) in prominent rectangles of pigment. (In the sky of Coucher de soleil no. 1, 1906–07, Collection Rijksmuseum Kröller-Müller, is the solar disk which Delaunay was later to make into a personal emblem)." Herbert describes the vibrating image of the sun in Metzinger's painting, and so too of Delaunay's Paysage au disque (1906–07), as "an homage to the decomposition of spectral light that lay at the heart of Neo-Impressionist color theory..."

Metzinger, followed closely by Delaunay—the two often painting together in 1906 and 1907—would develop a new sub-style of Neo-Impressionism that had great significance shortly thereafter within the context of their Cubist works. Piet Mondrian developed a similar mosaic-like Divisionist technique circa 1909. The Futurists later (1909–1916) would incorporate the style, under the influence of Gino Severini's Parisian works (from 1907 onward), into their dynamic paintings and sculpture.

 

In 1908, after a term in the military working as a regimental librarian, he met Sonia Terk; at the time she was married to a German art dealer whom she would soon divorce. In 1909, Delaunay began to paint a series of studies of the city of Paris and the Eiffel Tower, the Eiffel Tower series.

The following year, he married Terk, and the couple settled in a studio apartment in Paris, where their son Charles was born in January 1911. The same year, at the invitation of Wassily Kandinsky, Delaunay joined The Blue Rider (Der Blaue Reiter), a Munich-based group of artists. Delaunay was also successful in Germany, Switzerland, and Russia. He participated in the first Blaue Reiter exhibition in Munich and sold four works. Delaunay's paintings encouraged an enthusiastic response with Blaue Reiter. The Blaue Reiter connections led to the article by Erwin von Busse titled "Robert Delaunay's Methods of Composition", which appeared in the 1912 Blaue Reiter Almanac. Delaunay would go to exhibit in February of that year, in the second Blaue Reiter exhibition in Munich and Knave of Diamonds in Moscow.

"This happened in 1912. Cubism was in full force. I made paintings that seemed like prisms compared to the Cubism my fellow artists were producing. I was the heretic of Cubism. I had great arguments with my comrades who banned color from their palette, depriving it of all elemental mobility. I was accused of returning to Impressionism, of making decorative paintings, etc.… I felt I had almost reached my goal."

1912 was a turning point for Delaunay. On 13 March his first major exhibition in Paris closed after two weeks at the Galerie Barbazanges. The exhibition, organized by the French mathematician and actuary Maurice Princet, showed forty-six works from his early 1906-07 Divisionist period to his Proto-Cubist and Cubist Eiffel Tower paintings from 1909 to 1912. Apollinaire praised those works of the exhibition and proclaimed Delaunay as "an artist who has a monumental vision of the world."

In the 23 March 1912 issue of the satirical magazine L'Assiette au Beurre, the first published suggestion that Delaunay had broken with this group of Cubists appeared, in James Burkley's review of the Salon des Indépendants. Burkley wrote, "The "Cubists", who occupied only a room, have multiplied. Their leaders, Picasso and Braque, have not participated in their grouping, and Delaunay, commonly labeled a Cubist, has wished to isolate himself and declares he has nothing in common with Metzinger or Le Fauconnier."

With Apollinaire, Delaunay traveled to Berlin in January 1913 for an exhibition of his work at Galerie Der Sturm. On their way back to Paris, the two stayed with August Macke in Bonn, where Macke introduced them to Max Ernst. When his painting La ville de Paris was rejected by the Armory Show as being too big he instructed Samuel Halpert to remove all his works from the show.

Spanish and Portuguese years (1914–1920)
At the outbreak of the First World War in 1914 Sonia and Robert were staying in Fontarabie in Spain. They decided not to return to France and settled in Madrid. In August 1915 they moved to Portugal where they shared a home with Samuel Halpert and Eduardo Viana. With Viana and their friends Amadeo de Souza Cardoso (whom the Delaunays had already met in Paris) and José de Almada Negreiros they discussed an artistic partnership. First declared a deserter, Robert was declared unfit for military duty at the French consulate in Vigo on 23 June 1916.

The Russian Revolution brought an end to the financial support Sonia received from her family in Russia, and a different source of income was needed. In 1917 the Delaunays met Sergei Diaghilev in Madrid. Robert designed the stage for his production of Cleopatra (costume design by Sonia Delaunay). Robert Delaunay illustrates Tour Eiffel for Vicente Huidobro.

Paul Poiret refused a business partnership with Sonia in 1920, citing as one of the reasons her marriage to a deserter. The Der Sturm gallery in Berlin showed works by Sonia and Robert from their Portuguese period the same year.

Return to Paris and later life (1921–1941)

After the war, in 1921, they returned to Paris. Delaunay continued to work in both figurative and abstract themes, with a brief stint into Surrealism. Delaunay met André Breton and Tristan Tzara, who introduced him to both Dadaists and Surrealists. During the 1937 World Fair in Paris, Delaunay participated in the design of the railway and air travel pavilions.

When World War II erupted, the Delaunays moved to the Auvergne, in an effort to avoid the invading German forces. Suffering from cancer, Delaunay was unable to endure being moved around, and his health deteriorated. He died of cancer on 25 October 1941 in Montpellier at the age of 56. His body was reburied in 1952 in Gambais.

Gallery

Museum collections 
Robert Delaunay's works can be found in museums and loaned from private collections around the world:

Europe
The Musée National d'Art Moderne in Paris,
the Musée d'Art Moderne de Paris,
the Neue Nationalgalerie in Berlin,
the Bilbao Fine Arts Museum (Spain),
Kunstmuseum Basel (Switzerland),
the National Galleries of Scotland,
the New Art Gallery (Walsall, England),
Palazzo Cavour (Turin, Italy),
the Peggy Guggenheim Collection (Venice),
National Museum of Serbia,
Van Abbemuseum (Eindhoven, The Netherlands),
Palais des Beaux-Arts de Lille (France).

United States
The Albright-Knox Art Gallery (Buffalo, New York),
the Art Institute of Chicago,
the Columbus Museum of Art,
the Berkeley Art Museum,
the Minneapolis Institute of Arts,
the Fine Arts Museums of San Francisco,
the Frances Lehman Loeb Art Center at Vassar College (Poughkeepsie, New York), 
the Guggenheim Museum (New York City),
the Honolulu Museum of Art,
the Museum of Modern Art (New York City),
the National Gallery of Art (Washington, D.C.),
the Dallas Museum of Art (Dallas, TX),
the San Diego Museum of Art,
the Philadelphia Museum of Art,
and the Saint Louis Art Museum (Saint Louis, MO)

Rest of the world
The National Gallery of Victoria (Australia),
the Aichi Prefectural Museum of Art (Japan).

Publications 
 
 
 
 Gordon Hughes (1997). Envisioning Abstraction: The Simultaneity Of Robert Delaunay's First Disk.

See also 
 Abstraction Creation

References

External links 

 Centre Pompidou/MNAM-CCI/Bibliothèque Kandinsky, Fonds Sonia et Robert Delaunay
 Agence Photographique de la Réunion des musées nationaux et du Grand Palais des Champs-Elysées

1885 births
1941 deaths
20th-century French painters
20th-century French male artists
Abstract painters
Painters from Paris
Cubist artists
Divisionist painters
French male painters
French Impressionist painters
Orphism (art)
School of Paris
Deaths from cancer in France
World War II refugees
French abstract artists